Eyvan County, alternately spelled Eywan or Aivan (Shahrestān-e Eyvan) is in Ilam province, Iran. The capital of the county is the city of Eyvan. At the 2006 census, the county's population was 47,380 in 10,040 households. The following census in 2011 counted 48,833 people in 11,859 households. At the 2016 census, the county's population was 49,491 in 13,820 households. The population of Eyvan is mainly Kurdish.

Administrative divisions

The population history of Eyvan County's administrative divisions over three consecutive censuses is shown in the following table. The latest census shows two districts, four rural districts, and two cities.

List of cities and villages in the county by population.

See also
Kalhor
Taq-e Shirin and Farhad
Ghalajeh tunnel
Ghalajeh Protected Area
Ilam County
Chavar County

References

 

Counties of Ilam Province